Atrichum crispum is a species of moss.  It is dioicous with males being the same size as females or larger.

Common names 
The following is a list of common names the species goes by:

 Crispy smoothcap moss
 Strongly crisped smoothcaped moss
 Wave-leaved crane’s-bill moss
 Fountain smoothcap
 Atrichum moss
 Oval starburst moss

Distribution and habitat 
The species has a disjunct distribution where it occurs in Europe and eastern parts of North America. In Europe only male plants have been  discovered.

It occurs in eight regions of Estonia with it first being  found in Estonia during 2004.

North America 
It is frequent in the Atlantic coastal plain but also occurs in the mountains.

It is native to five counties in Florida.

British Isles 
It is thought that the species was introduced to the British Isles from North America.

British bryologist John Nowell was the first to find the species in Britain in 1848 near Rochdale, and it was first found in Ireland during 1957.

References 

Polytrichaceae
Bryophyta of North America